Steve Longworth (27 July 1948 – 10 October 2021) was an English professional snooker player.

Career
Born in 1948, Longworth turned professional in 1984. He lost his first match at the International Open of that year 4–5 to Steve Newbury, but reached the last 16 of the 1985 Classic, where he lost 3–5 to Cliff Thorburn, and the semi-final of the 1985 English Professional Championship, where Tony Knowles defeated him 9–6.

He went on to reach the last 16 of the 1986 UK Championship, losing 6–9 to John Parrott, the 1987 World Championship, where he beat Kirk Stevens 10–4 before falling 7–13 to the young Stephen Hendry, and the 1988 Canadian Masters, losing 0–5 to Jimmy White.

Longworth also registered ten last-32 finishes in ranking events, the last coming at the 1989 British Open, where he was defeated 1–5 by Parrott.

Following this, he dropped out of the top 64 during the 1990–91 season, and fell to 131st in the rankings in 1995; this was insufficient for Longworth to keep his place on the tour, and he left professional snooker at the age of 46.

Personal life
Longworth had two children and three grandchildren and settled into retirement before his death in October 2021.

Longworth died on 9 October 2021, at the age of 73. Tributes were led by former practise partner Dennis Taylor.

References

English snooker players
1948 births
2021 deaths
Sportspeople from Blackburn